The 1966 Australian Grand Prix was a motor race staged on 20 February 1966 at the Lakeside Circuit in Queensland, Australia. The race, which had 15 starters, was open to Racing Cars complying with the Australian National Formula or the Australian 1½ Litre Formula. It was both the 31st Australian Grand Prix and race 6 of the 1966 Tasman Championship for Drivers.

Graham Hill won the race driving BRM P261. It was his only Australian Grand Prix victory.

Classification 

Results as follows:

Notes 
Pole position: Jackie Stewart – 0'55.5
Fastest lap: Jackie Stewart / Graham Hill – 0'55.9

References

Grand Prix
Australian Grand Prix
Tasman Series
Sport in Brisbane
Australian Grand Prix